John O'Brien is a Gaelic footballer who played for the Round Towers club and at senior level for the Dublin county team. He made his debut in the 2008 O'Byrne Cup against Wicklow.

O'Brien made his NFL debut for Dublin against Westmeath in the first round. He was on Dublin's winning team for the 2008 O'Byrne Cup winning team which defeated Longford in the final.

References

Year of birth missing (living people)
Living people
Alumni of Garda Síochána College
Dublin inter-county Gaelic footballers
Garda Síochána officers
Round Towers Clondalkin Gaelic footballers